Terry R. Gale (born 7 June 1946) is an Australian professional golfer.

Professional career 
Gale had a successful amateur career before turning professional at a relatively advanced age in 1976. From the mid-1970s to the early 1990s he won regularly on the PGA Tour of Australasia, the Japan Golf Tour, and the Asia Golf Circuit. Once he turned 50, he joined the European Seniors Tour, where he won seven tournaments. His best season on that tour was 2003, when he finished third on the Order of Merit. He also played on the Japanese Seniors Tour.

Personal life 
Gale originally worked as a sheep farmer.

Off the course, Gale was the second Chairman of the PGA Tour of Australasia. His son, Mark Gale was a professional Australian rules footballer. Gale was also a talented cricketer in his youth, representing his state on occasion, although never at First Class level.

Amateur wins
1969 Western Australian Amateur
1972 Western Australian Amateur
1974 Australian Amateur, Western Australian Amateur
1975 Western Australian Amateur

Professional wins (44)

Japan Golf Tour wins (2)

1Co-sanctioned by the Asia Golf Circuit

Japan Golf Tour playoff record (0–1)

PGA Tour of Australasia wins (16)

PGA Tour of Australasia playoff record (6–0)

Other Australian wins (11)
1969 Nedlands Masters (as an amateur)
1970 Nedlands Masters (as an amateur)
1971 Nedlands Masters (as an amateur)
1972 Western Australian Open (as an amateur)
1975 Western Australian Open (as an amateur)
1976 Nedlands Masters
1979 Mandurah Classic
1980 Mandurah Classic
1981 Western Australia PGA Championship
1990 Western Australian Open
1992 Nedlands Masters

Asia Golf Circuit wins (6)
1978 Singapore Open
1983 Malaysian Open
1984 Indonesia Open
1985 Benson & Hedges Malaysian Open
1987 Benson & Hedges Malaysian Open
1989 Dunlop International Open (also Japan Golf Tour event)

European Senior Tour wins (7)

European Senior Tour playoff record (0–2)

Australian senior wins (2)
1997 Australian PGA Seniors Championship
2006 Australian PGA Seniors Championship

Results in major championships

Note: Gale only played in The Open Championship.
CUT = missed the half-way cut (3rd round cut in 1980 and 1985 Open Championships)
"T" = tied

Team appearances
Amateur
Eisenhower Trophy (representing Australia): 1970, 1972, 1974
Commonwealth Tournament (representing Australia): 1971
Sloan Morpeth Trophy (representing Australia): 1969 (winners)

Professional
World Cup (representing Australia): 1983
Alfred Dunhill Challenge (representing Australasia): 1995 (non-playing captain)

References

External links

Profile on CricketArchive

Australian male golfers
PGA Tour of Australasia golfers
Japan Golf Tour golfers
European Senior Tour golfers
People educated at Scotch College, Perth
People from the Wheatbelt (Western Australia)
Golfers from Perth, Western Australia
1946 births
Living people